The Shikar Club is an international sporting club founded in London in 1909 by Old Boys of Eton and Rugby to champion the cause of hunting and in particular big game hunting. Its founding members included: Frederick Courtney Selous,  P.B. van der Byl and Charles Edward Radclyffe.

Inauguration

On 7 June 1909 at the Café Royal, Regent Street in London more than seventy well known hunting and shooting men met at an inaugural dinner to found the Shikar Club. The event was presided over by the Earl of Lonsdale and The Field for June 1909 devoted a page and a half to a description of the event. A discussion took place after the meal at which a committee was formed  to write a constitution of the Club at their leisure.

The Shikar Club promoted shooting at international shooting exhibitions with the clear expression of big game hunting within legitimate class and national identities,

Membership

The membership of the club included many high-ranking military men, such as Sir Claude Champion de Crespigny, described as "one of the hardest and pluckiest men in England… ready to box, ride, walk, run, shoot, fence, sail or swim with anyone over fifty on equal terms".

The society once championed big-game hunters, who included: Abel Chapman, Alfred Pease, Hilary Hook, the Marquess of Valdueza and Maurice Egerton, who in pursuit of big game travelled the globe hunting. Some members, such as Thomas Alexander Barns, H. A. Bryden and C. W. L. Bulpett, published books and articles on hunting and exploring, while others were artists and naturalists, men such as John Guille Millais. 

The Shikar Club continues to exist and meets regularly at the Savoy Hotel, London, for the purposes of continuing the tradition of hunting and shooting. The emphasis today is on sustainable hunting and the conservation of wildlife. An aristocratic membership continues, with Prince Philip, Duke of Edinburgh a holding a membership prior to his death in 2021.

References

Notes

Hunting organizations